Mary Matthews may refer to:
 Mary L. Matthews, American educator and missionary
 Mary Ellen Matthews, American photographer
 Mary Ann Wrighten, née Mary Matthews, English singer, actress and composer
 Mary Mathews Adams, née Mathews, Irish-born American writer and philanthropist